Lyte as a Rock is the debut studio album by American hip hop recording artist MC Lyte. It was released in May 1988, via First Priority and Atlantic Records, and featured production from Audio Two, Prince Paul, King of Chill and his group, Alliance.

In July 1988 the album peaked  50 on the then Billboard Top Black Albums, spending 16 weeks on the chart.

Despite not having much commercial success, it has had a very good evaluation by critics since its publication and it has been considered by various media and specialized press as one of the best and most important rap albums, both in the 80s and in history, mainly due to its influence on the subsequent work of other female rappers. In January 1998, Lyte as a Rock was included on The Sources "The 100 Best Rap Albums of All Time" list. The album is broken down track-by-track by MC Lyte in Brian Coleman's book Check the Technique.

Background 
In 1987, at the age of 16, Lyte released her debut single, I Cram to Understand U (Sam), about drug addiction and its impact on relationships, being one of the first songs written for the crack era. As she has stated, she was 12 years old at the time of writing.

In 1988 she published her debut album Lyte as a Rock. In addition to being one of the first female rap LPs (previously only some groups like Salt-N-Pepa and The Sequence had published), it would be the first full album of a female rapper as a solo artist.

Recording and production
As stated in an interview for Okayplayer, all the lyrics on the album are from a rhyming book that she has written over the course of several years. During an interview with Jet in 2015, Lyte commented on the production of the songs:

Most of the songs had the contribution in the composition and production of the rap duo Audio Two  (who were also very close to Lyte since childhood), King of Chill and his group Alliance. The track "Mc Lyte Likes Swingin" had Prince Paul of Stetsasonic in production, who later gained much recognition for his work with De La Soul.

Music and lyrics
In addition to "I Cram to Understand U", three other songs were released as singles: 10% Dis (a diss track to then-Hurby Azor associate Antoinette), Paper Thin (in which she confronts her boyfriend for an infidelity) and the eponymous Lyte as a Rock. At the beginning of "I am Woman" Lyte quotes Helen Reddy's hit "I Am Woman" saying "I am woman hear me roar". The last track "Don't Cry, Big Girls" is built around a sample of The Four Seasons' "Big Girls Don't Cry"  (1963).

During the MC Lyte tribute at the 2006 VH1 Hip Hop Honors Da Brat and Remy Ma sang the chorus for the track "Kickin' 4 Brooklyn".

"Paper Thin" and "Lyte as a Rock" had music videos  directed by Lionel C. Martin.

Critical reception 

Regarding the album "Lyte as a Rock", Robert Christgau from Village Voice has commented "Unlike so many of her femme-metal counterparts, she knows how to talk tough without yielding to the stupid temptations of macho." but also criticized the producers as "chill too close to the max as she attempts to carry the music with her rap." and "Lyte's quotes (not samples) from "I'm in the Mood for Love," "Big Girls Don't Cry," "I Am Woman," and "Hit the Road Jack" aren't loud enough to compensate.", Following the album's release, that year Village Voice would also call Lyte "hip-hop's best female vocalist." For his part, Ken Tucker from The Philadelphia Inquirer would give a rating of 4/4.

Legacy and influence
In retrospect, Rob Theakston of AllMusic reviews "(...) Lyte as a Rock has aged better than most records that came out during hip-hop's formative years, although at certain moments it has become dated since its release. But what has aged is more than compensated by the classic tunes and the disc's potent historical impact on a generation of women MCs. A classic." PopMatters' Mark Anthony Neal called the album "one of the most underrated debuts in hip-hop history". In February 2008, Rolling Stone included "Lyte as a Rock" along with other albums such as N.W.A's debut album Straight Outta Compton and Public Enemy's It Takes a Nation of Millions to Hold Us Back on their list of the best albums of 1988, which considered "Rap's greatest year".

In October 2017 Complex magazine's Michael Gonzales commented "MC Lyte emerged from the depths of Brooklyn caring more about her rhyme skills than her make-up.(...) Homegirl might've been Lyte as a Rock, but her debut album was heavy as a boulder." XXL's Dominique Zonyee considered that with the release of his debut album Lyte "indirectly challenged anyone who said she couldn’t or wouldn’t have success as a rapper." commenting "After that, how could anyone deny women the same opportunities as male rappers. Even with the obvious feminist tone, Lyte did not compromise her lyricism. On so many levels, the rapper's debut has become a pillar of hope for female MCs and has been inspirational in helping other ladies break barriers in the game."

In 2018, on the 30th anniversary of its publication, it was reviewed by Jesse Ducker of Albumism, who commented "Still sounds as good as it did three decades ago. Lyte demonstrates tremendous verbal ability on Lyte as a Rock, using her husky voice and conversational flow to create wicked rhymes to go along with the neck-snapping beats. She remains “herself” throughout the album, as defiant and confident as any other emcee to ever pick up the microphone. And it's this confidence and sheer skills that carry Lyte as a Rock and makes it as memorable as any album in the formative era of hip-hop." During another review he opined that with the release of "Lyte as a Rock" Lyte "stood shoulder to shoulder with the Golden Era’s best emcees." In 2019 Kyle Eustice of HipHopDX would comment on a review of the album:  Simon Pearce of Pitchfork would write in his album review:

Accolades

Track listing 
The song writing information is according to the ASCAP website.

Sample credits

Personnel 
Information taken from Allmusic.
 Lead vocals  – MC Lyte
 Producer, Programmed By – Alliance (tracks: 1 and 7), Audio Two (tracks: 2, 5, 8 to 10) King of Chill (3 and 6) and Prince Paul
 Art Direction – Bob Defrin
 Design – Carol Bobolts
 Engineer – Dan Sheehan, Gary Clugston, Mike Dee, Phil DeMartino, Shlom Sonnenfeld, Yoram Vazan
 Executive-Producer – Nat Robinson
 Photography By – John Pinderhughes

Charts

References

1988 debut albums
MC Lyte albums